Major Sir Philip Hunloke  (born Philip Perceval, 26 November 1868 – 1 April 1947) was a British sailor and courtier.

He was the son of Captain Philip Perceval of the Royal Horse Guards, but changed his name in 1905. He was a crew member of the British boat Sorais, which won the bronze medal in the 8-metre class in the 1908 Summer Olympics.

He served as a Groom in Waiting to King George V from 1911 to 1936, to Edward VIII in 1936, and an extra groom-in-waiting to George VI from 1937 to 1947. He also served in the Boer War and First World War, reaching the rank of Major. He was Commodore of the Royal Yacht Club from 1943 until his death and was a Younger Brother at Trinity House.

He was the father of the Conservative MP Henry Hunloke. His maternal grandmother was Sophia Sidney, Baroness De L'Isle and Dudley, daughter of William IV of the United Kingdom.

References

External links
 DatabaseOlympics Profile

1868 births
1947 deaths
British male sailors (sport)
Sailors at the 1908 Summer Olympics – 8 Metre
Olympic sailors of Great Britain
Olympic bronze medallists for Great Britain
Olympic medalists in sailing
People educated at Stubbington House School
Knights Grand Cross of the Royal Victorian Order
Medalists at the 1908 Summer Olympics
Members of the British Royal Household
Royal Buckinghamshire Yeomanry officers
Imperial Yeomanry officers
British Army personnel of the Second Boer War
British Army personnel of World War I
Members of Trinity House